Rune Emanuelsson (8 October 1923 – 21 March 1993) was a Swedish football defender born in Gothenburg. He was nicknamed Killing (meaning kid, young goat). He was also part of Sweden's squad for the football tournament at the 1948 Summer Olympics, but he did not play in any matches. He won a total of 13 caps for the Sweden national team between 1945 and 1951.

He debuted for IFK Göteborg in 1942 and played for the club until 1955 when he retired. He died in 1993.

Clubs
 IFK Göteborg (1942–55)

References

External links
Lists of IFK Göteborg players
biographical facts

1923 births
1993 deaths
Swedish footballers
Sweden international footballers
IFK Göteborg players
Olympic footballers of Sweden
Olympic gold medalists for Sweden
Footballers at the 1948 Summer Olympics
Medalists at the 1948 Summer Olympics
Association football midfielders
Footballers from Gothenburg
20th-century Swedish people